While most of the traditional women's fraternities or sororities were founded decades before the start of the 20th century, the first ever specifically Christian-themed Greek Letter Organization formed was the Kappa Phi Club, founded in Kansas in 1916. Kappa Phi was a women's sisterhood that developed out of a bible study and remains one of the largest nationally present Christian women's collegiate clubs today. Later organizations added more defined social programming along with a Christian emphasis, bridging the gap between non-secular traditional sororities and church-sponsored bible study groups, campus ministries and sect-based clubs and study groups.

History
All collegiate fraternities and sororities, beginning with Phi Beta Kappa in 1776, had, at inception, either a tacit or overt spiritual component.  This may have been as simple as an official opening or closing prayer, expanding to Biblical lessons contained within rituals, and rules regarding behavior that are modeled on various Christian, or Jewish strictures.  Over time, traditional (~original) fraternities and sororities have relaxed some of the wording of their rituals and codes to allow a more pluralistic model and open membership to a broader group of collegians.

Insularity, then integration
The rise of specifically Jewish, then Catholic, then Black, and then specifically Christian fraternities and sororities was a response (by the Jewish and Catholic groups first, then by students of non-white ethnicity) to the desire for fraternal membership where membership was barred. But it was important to note that America was far more insular in the pre-WWII era; in many cases Jewish and Catholic families, and their rabbis and priests wished to ensure that their children socialized primarily within their own religious traditions, thus establishing their own, competing Greek Letter organizations (GLOs) distinct from the "WASPy" traditional Greeks. After the integration of WWII GIs and the war's immediate aftermath, colleges and workplaces were abruptly far more integrated. Prior to WWII, relatively few Black or Hispanic students entered college. But this would change with the passage of the G.I. Bill. Soon, the separate Jewish nationals and scattered locals began to merge, responding as traditional Greek chapters became more open to religious integration, adding Jewish and Catholic members.  Only a fraction of Jewish fraternities remain, after multiple mergers. Similarly, Catholic nationals and locals merged, began opening chapters on non-Catholic campuses and welcoming students of Protestant heritage.  Yet Black, then Hispanic and Asian GLOs which likewise began to form have remained widely popular, some using the moniker "Multicultural", though all the national GLOs have removed "bias clauses" from their governing documents and policies, and all are racially integrated.

The idea of separate, thematic-focused fraternities and sororities continued to interest Christian students, their families and spiritual leaders. Long-established Bible study groups took on Greek Letter names, the first being Kappa Phi, a Bible-study and service club on twenty-four campuses; Yet the Kappa Phi Club still does not self-identify as a social sorority.  Some organizers, assuming that the traditional GLOs lacked sufficient moral guardrails in pursuit of social programming, emerged to create the first objectively Christian (Protestant, then Evangelical) fraternities and sororities.

Traditionally, formation of the Christian sororities, later to become national organizations, has followed establishment of Christian fraternities, some as independent groups, and some in a "brother/sister" relationship, except in the case of Alpha Delta Chi, the first such Christian-emphasis organization on its campus.  That sorority was founded in 1925 while Alpha Gamma Omega was founded in 1927, two years later, likewise at UCLA. Viewed broadly, these Christian Greek organizations enjoyed local success in their early years but they did not experience the national growth seen by more traditional Greek organizations.

1980s resurgence
A more novel situation occurred in 1987 when Chi Alpha Omega was founded as a co-educational Christian Greek organization. It wasn't until 1998 that Sigma Alpha Omega broke off from Chi Alpha Omega to form a women's-only ministry. Sigma Alpha Omega is now governed by a separate national president and board of trustees, and has grown to include 33 chapters throughout the country. Chi Alpha Omega continues as a men's organization.

In 1988, the founding of Sigma Phi Lambda on the campus of the University of Texas at Austin sparked new growth among Christian sororities. "Phi Lamb" was founded by women who saw value in the brotherhood exemplified by Beta Upsilon Chi and wished to create a female counterpart, since  was a male-only organization.  Sigma Phi Lambda today has an executive director, national board of directors, and regional directors, and is the largest Christian social sorority in the nation, with thirty-one chapters.

Multicultural sorority expansion
There has been a surge in the multicultural segment of Christian sororities in recent years, with the establishment of sororities such as:
Alpha Lambda Omega Christian Sorority, Inc. (1990) 
Delta Psi Epsilon Christian Sorority, Inc. (1999)
Psi Delta Chi Sorority, Inc. (1994)
Pi Iota Chi Christian Multicultural Sorority, Inc. (2001)
Alpha Theta Omega Christian Sorority, Inc. (2002)
Zeta Iota Chi Christian Sorority, Inc (2003)
Theta Sigma Lambda Christian Sorority, Inc. (2008)
Delta Phi Psi Christian Sorority, Inc. (2008), a member of Association of Fraternal Christian Organizations and Ministries, 
Tau Rho Omicron Christian Sorority, Inc., a Christian sorority for business and professional women (2011).

These are largely or exclusively organized as non-collegiate chapters.

Non-conventional Christian sororities
These might be categorized as mission-oriented, serve African-American or nominally Multicultural populations, and are typically non-collegiate.  Often tightly controlled by a founding pastor:

 Theta Chi Gamma Christian Fellowship, founded in 2008 by Mario Jimerson as a Christian fraternity and sorority.
 Delta Alpha Omega (aka Devoted to Alpha & Omega) began on November 7, 2009 in Saint Louis, Missouri. 
 Theta Phi Sigma Christian Sorority, Inc., also known as the Pink Society, was founded in 2009 in Montgomery, Alabama by Jessica Martin.  This organization aims to combat teen pregnancy and high school dropout rates in high school and college. 
 The Daughters of Christ, Inc. (aka the Daughters of Christ "SOARority") was founded by Darnella Moore. 
 Zeta Nu Delta Christian Sorority, Inc. was founded by Besceglia Hall in 2012.

List of sororities
Where collegiate, several are noted in the Baird's Manual Archive online. Where there is no current information on the number of chapters, a question mark appears; these groups may be dormant.

See also
 Christian fraternities
 Cultural interest fraternities and sororities
 List of social fraternities and sororities

References

Sorority